Rest-harrow may refer to:

 Ononis, a genus of perennial herbs and shrubs, including:
 Ononis repens, common restharrow
 Aplasta ononaria, a species of moth